The 2015 Major League Baseball All-Star Game was the 86th edition of the Major League Baseball All-Star Game. The game was played at Great American Ball Park in Cincinnati, Ohio on Tuesday, July 14. It was televised nationally on Fox. The American League All-Stars defeated the National League All-Stars by a score of 6–3.

On January 21, 2013, then-Major League Baseball (MLB) Commissioner Bud Selig, announced the 2015 All-Star Game would be hosted by the Cincinnati Reds. This was the first time the city of Cincinnati has hosted the All-Star Game since the 1988 All-Star Game was played at Riverfront Stadium.

On July 15, 2014, Selig also announced that Pete Rose would not be prohibited from participating in the 2015 All-Star Game ceremonies. Rose was an All-Star for 13 of the 19 seasons he played on the Reds and was a member of the Big Red Machine. In 1991, Rose was permanently banned from MLB for baseball betting. Rose, wearing a red sport coat, appeared on the field in front of the pitcher's mound before the game and received a standing ovation alongside former teammates Johnny Bench, Barry Larkin, and Joe Morgan.

On May 12, 2015, the Reds announced that Todd Frazier would serve as the 2015 All-Star Game spokesperson.

Mike Trout, an outfielder for the Los Angeles Angels, was named the All-Star Game Most Valuable Player for the second straight year.

Fan balloting

Starters
Balloting for the 2015 All-Star Game starters began online April 23 and ended on July 2. The top vote-getters at each position (including the designated hitter for the American League) and the top three among outfielders, were named the starters for their respective leagues. The results were announced on July 5. A record 620 million votes were cast, surpassing the record of 391 million votes in 2012. Josh Donaldson was the leading vote-getter with 14,090,188 votes, breaking the record that Josh Hamilton set in 2012 with 11,073,744 votes. Bryce Harper set a new NL record for votes this year with 13,864,950 votes.

However, MLB canceled at least 65 million ballots on grounds of fraud and ballot stuffing. At one point during the balloting, the top vote-getters for eight of the starting nine positions for the American League were Kansas City Royals players.

Final roster spot
After the rosters were finalized, a second ballot of five players per league was created for the All-Star Final Vote to determine the 34th and final player of each roster. The online balloting were conducted from July 6 through July 10. Brett Gardner of the New York Yankees was removed from the ballot on July 9 after he replaced Alex Gordon on the roster due to injury. The winners of the All-Star Final Vote were Mike Moustakas of the Kansas City Royals (AL) and Carlos Martinez of the St. Louis Cardinals (NL).

Rosters

American League

National League

Andrew McCutchen was named starter in place of Giancarlo Stanton due to injury.
Kris Bryant was named as the roster replacement for Stanton.
Albert Pujols was named starter in place of Miguel Cabrera due to injury.
Mark Teixeira was named as the roster replacement for Cabrera.
Brett Gardner was named as the roster replacement for Alex Gordon.
Adam Jones was named starter in place of Alex Gordon due to injury.
Brian Dozier was named as the roster replacement for José Bautista due to injury.
DJ LeMahieu was named starter in place of Dee Gordon due to injury.
Troy Tulowitzki was named as the roster replacement for Dee Gordon.
Hector Santiago was named as a replacement for Sonny Gray due to Gray starting on Sunday.
Clayton Kershaw was named as a replacement for Max Scherzer due to Scherzer starting on Sunday.
Joc Pederson was named starter in place of Matt Holliday due to injury.
Ryan Braun was named as a roster replacement for Holliday.
#: Indicates player would not play (replaced as per reference notes above).

Game summary
Mike Trout of the Angels led off the game with a home run off Zack Greinke. The NL tied the score in the bottom of the second when Jhonny Peralta drove in Paul Goldschmidt with an RBI single off AL starter Dallas Keuchel. In the top of the fifth, Prince Fielder, who was pinch hitting for Nelson Cruz, hit a go-ahead RBI single off Dodgers ace Clayton Kershaw that scored Trout to give the AL a 2–1 lead. The next batter, Lorenzo Cain, hit an RBI double to score Albert Pujols to make it a 3–1 ballgame. 
In the bottom of the sixth, Andrew McCutchen homered off Chris Archer to make it a one-run game. In the top of the seventh, Trout walked and was lifted for pinch runner Brock Holt who scored on an RBI double by Manny Machado to give the AL a 4–2 lead. Machado then scored on a sac fly by Fielder to make it a 5–2 game. In the top of the eighth inning, the Twins' Brian Dozier hit a home run to make it a 6–2 ballgame.	
In the bottom of the ninth, Ryan Braun led off with a triple to right field off of Twins closer Glen Perkins, then scored on a sacrifice fly by Brandon Crawford to make it a 6–3 score. The next batter, Cubs rookie Kris Bryant, flied to right for the second out, and finally, Joe Panik lined out to left field to seal the AL's third straight victory and earn home-field advantage in the World Series.

Starting lineup

Line score

See also

List of Major League Baseball All-Star Game winners
All-Star Futures Game
Home Run Derby

References

External links

Official website of the All-Star Game
2015 Major League Baseball All-Star Game at ESPN

Major League Baseball All-Star Game
Major League Baseball All-Star Game
Major League Baseball All Star Game
2010s in Cincinnati
July 2015 sports events in the United States
Baseball competitions in Cincinnati